Gregory C. Gretsch, mostly known as Greg Gretsch, is a venture capitalist at Jackson Square Ventures in San Francisco, California.

Biography 
Gretsch  has a bachelor's degree in management information systems from the University of Georgia. Early in his career, he was an IT consultant for Andersen Consulting (now Accenture). He then spent time at Apple Computer where, in addition to spearheading product marketing programs, he led a project partnering with CNN that offered the first public showcase of QuickTime. In 1993, Gretsch launched his first startup, Vicarious, an education and reference CD-ROM publisher. He started GiftONE in 1996, which he sold to SkyMall. In 1997, Gretsch co-founded Connectify, an enterprise software company that sold software for Electronic Direct Marketing. After selling Connectify to Kana Communications in 1999, he stayed on board as the Vice President of Electronic Direct Marketing.

Gretsch joined Sigma Partners in 2001 where he began his venture career. After 11 years at Sigma Partners, he and fellow partners Pete Solvik and Bob Spinner, along with Josh Breinlinger, spun out to form Sigma West in 2011. The firm was rebranded Jackson Square Ventures and continued under that name as of 2019.

The Midas List 
In January 2009, Gretsch was ranked #19 on the Forbes Annual Midas list of top tech venture capitalists.

Investments 
At Sigma Partners, Gretsch has invested in Attributor, EqualLogic (sold to Dell), Jellyvision, oDesk (now Upwork), Responsys (IPO, then acquired by Oracle), Sharpcast, TalkingBlocks (sold to HP) and Zetta. Gretsch's personal investments include Postini (sold to Google) and SlimDevices (sold to Logitech).

Gretsch led Sigma's A round investment in EqualLogic (alongside Charles River Ventures), in 2001. When the company was bought by Dell in 2008 it was the VC industry's largest-ever all-cash deal, valued at a reported $1.4 billion. It was this deal which led to Gretsch's inclusion in the Forbes Midas list in January 2009.

References

External links 
 Video of Greg Gretsch interviewed by Forbes.com when named to the 2009 Midas List

Accenture people
American consultants
Living people
American venture capitalists
Year of birth missing (living people)